Zuberbühler  is a village and municipality in Chaco Province in northern Argentina.

Education 
Zuberbühler has a primary level school.

Communication channels 

See also 
 Pascal Zuberbühler, Swiss athlete
 Nieves Zuberbühler, Argentine journalist

References

Populated places in Chaco Province